Caccobius is a genus of fungi in the Thelebolaceae family. This is a monotypic genus, containing the single species Caccobius minusculus.

References

External links
Index Fungorum

Monotypic Leotiomycetes genera